Raajaveedhi is a 1979 Indian Malayalam film, directed by Senan and produced by Panayil Bhaskaran Nair. The film stars Raghavan, Adoor Pankajam, Ambika and Aranmula Ponnamma in the lead roles. The film has musical score by A. T. Ummer.

Cast 
Raghavan 
Adoor Pankajam 
Ambika 
Aranmula Ponnamma 
Sadhana

Soundtrack 
The music was composed by A. T. Ummer and the lyrics were written by Bichu Thirumala.

References

External links
 

1979 films
1970s Malayalam-language films